El aguacero (Spanish: "rain") may refer to:

"El aguacero", tango by Cátulo Castillo 
"El aguacero", song by Colombian singer , written Alejandro Gómez Cáceres, silver prize at Viña del Mar International Song Festival 1999
"El aguacero", song by Juan Luis Guerra best video at Premio Lo Nuestro 1999